Ankleshwar Junction railway station  is a railway station serving Ankleshwar town, in Bharuch district of Gujarat State of India. It is under Vadodara railway division of Western Railway zone of Indian Railways. It is located on New Delhi–Mumbai main line of the Indian Railways.

It is located at 20 m above sea level and has four platforms. , electrified double broad-gauge railway line exist and at this station, 87 trains stops and one train each originates and terminates. Surat Airport, is at distance of 65 kilo meters.

History

The BB&CI Railway was incorporated in 1855, starting with the construction of a  broad-gauge track from Ankleshwar Junction to Utran in Gujarat on the West Coast.

See also
Rajpipla State Railway

References

Railway stations in Bharuch district
Vadodara railway division
Railway junction stations in Gujarat
Transport in Ankleshwar